Rai 3 (formerly Rete 3) is an Italian free-to-air television channel owned and operated by state-owned public broadcaster RAI – Radiotelevisione italiana. It was launched on 15 December 1979 and its programming is centred towards cultural and regional programming. It has always been considered the most left-leaning channel of Italian public television; its direct competitor to Mediaset's Rete 4.

Foreign language programming
In the Aosta Valley, Rai 3 broadcasts some programmes in French, about less than three hours a week.

In the Trentino-Alto Adige/Südtirol region, Rai Sudtirol timeshares broadcast hours with Rai 3 when not broadcasting.

In Friuli-Venezia Giulia region, Rai 3 Bis (TDD Furlanija Julijska Krajina) is a separate channel which broadcast daily from 18:40 with a half-hour daily newscast in Slovene, and other shows in Slovene. In accordance with a bilateral cooperation agreement between Italy and Slovenia, Slovene-language shows produced by Rai 3 Bis are also aired on the Slovenian regional television channel TV Koper-Capodistria and on State-owned TV Slovenija 2.

Programs
A few shows include:
TG3, Rai 3 main news service directed by Luca Mazzà
TGR (Regional news service, directed by Vincenzo Morgante)
Gazebo
Doc3
Che tempo che fa
Chi l'ha Visto?
Vieni via con me
Sabrina the Teenage Witch
Law & Order
Friends
Desperate Housewives
The Defenders
The Spaghetti Family
Glob
Inspector Gadget
Melevisione
Buongiorno EstateUEFA Europa League (one game per matchday live, possibility of broadcasting all semi-finals due to law 8/99 if at least an italian team is involved)UEFA Europa Conference League (one game per matchday live, possibility of broadcasting all semi-finals due to law 8/99 if at least an italian team is involved) Logos 

References

Further reading
 Delio De Martino, Per una storia di Raitre. Premessa di Raffaele Nigro'', Bari, Levante Editori, 2009, .

External links
 Official Site 
 

Television channels and stations established in 1979
3
Italian-language television stations